A cultigen or cultivated plant is a plant that has been deliberately altered or selected by humans; it is the result of artificial selection. For the most part, these plants have commercial value in horticulture, agriculture or forestry. Because cultigens are defined by their mode of origin and not by where they grow, plants meeting this definition remain cultigens whether they are naturalised, deliberately planted in the wild, or grown in cultivation.

Cultigens arise in the following ways: 
 through the selection of variants from the wild or cultivation, including vegetative sports (aberrant growth that can be reproduced reliably in cultivation)
 from plants that are the result of plant breeding and selection programs
 from genetically modified plants (plants modified by the deliberate implantation of genetic material)
 from graft-chimaeras (plants grafted to produce mixed tissue, the graft material possibly from wild plants, special selections, or hybrids).

Naming
Cultigens may be named in any of a number of ways. The traditional method of scientific naming is under the International Code of Nomenclature for algae, fungi, and plants, and many of the most important cultigens, like maize (Zea mays) and banana (Musa acuminata), are so named. Although it is perfectly in order to give a cultigen a botanical name, in any rank desired, now or at any other time, these days it is more common for cultigens to be given names in accordance with the principles, rules and recommendations laid down in the International Code of Nomenclature for Cultivated Plants (ICNCP) which provides for the names of cultigens in three classification categories, the cultivar, the Group (formerly cultivar-group), and the grex. With this, one could say that there is a separate discipline of cultivated plant taxonomy, which forms one of the ways to look at cultigens. The ICNCP does not recognize the use of trade designations and other marketing devices as scientifically acceptable names, but does provide advice on how they should be presented.

Not all cultigens have been given names according to the Cultivated Plant Code. Apart from ancient cultigens like those mentioned above there may be occasional anthropogenic plants such as those that are the result of breeding, selection, and tissue grafting that are of no commercial value and have therefore not been given names according to the ICNCP.

Formal definition 
A cultigen is a plant whose origin or selection is primarily due to intentional human activity.

The wild/cultivated distinction 
Interest in the distinction between wild and cultivated plants dates back to antiquity. Botanical historian Alan Morton notes that wild and cultivated plants (cultigens) were of intense interest to the ancient Greek botanists (partly for religious reasons) and that the distinction was discussed in some detail by Theophrastus (370–285 BCE) the "Father of Botany." Theophrastus was a pupil of both Plato and Aristotle and succeeded the latter as head of the Peripatetic School of Philosophy at the Lyceum in Athens. Theophrastus accepted the view that it was human action, not divine intervention, that produced cultivated plants (cultigens) from wild plants and he also "had an inkling of the limits of culturally induced (phenotypic) changes and of the importance of genetic constitution" (Historia Plantarum III, 2,2 and Causa Plantarum I, 9,3). He also noted that cultivated varieties of fruit trees would degenerate if cultivated from seed.

Origin of term 

The word cultigen was coined in 1918 by Liberty Hyde Bailey (1858–1954), an American horticulturist, botanist and cofounder of the American Society for Horticultural Science. He was aware of the need for special categories for those cultivated plants that had arisen by intentional human activity and which would not fit neatly into the Linnaean hierarchical classification of ranks used by the International Rules of Botanical Nomenclature (which later became the International Code of Nomenclature for algae, fungi, and plants).
In his 1918 paper Bailey noted that for anyone preparing a descriptive account of the cultivated plants of a country (he was at that time preparing such an account for North America) it would be clear that there are two gentes or kinds (Latin singular, gens; plural, gentes) of plants. Firstly, those that are of known origin or nativity "of known habitat". These he referred to as indigens. The other kind was: ... a domesticated group of which the origin may be unknown or indefinite, which has such characters as to separate it from known indigens, and which is probably not represented by any type specimen or exact description, having therefore no clear taxonomic beginning.
He called this second kind of plant a cultigen, the word derived from the conflation of the Latin cultus (cultivated) and gens (kind).

In 1923 Bailey extended his original discussion, emphasising that he was dealing with plants at the rank of species and referred to indigens as those that are discovered in the wild and cultigens as plants that arise in some way under the hand of man. He then defined a cultigen as a species, or its equivalent, that has appeared under domestication.

Bailey's definitions 
Bailey soon altered his 1923 definition of cultigen when, in 1924, he gave a new definition in the Glossary of his Manual of Cultivated Plants as: Plant or group known only in cultivation; presumably originating under domestication; contrast with indigen This, in essence, is the definition given at the head of this piece. This definition of the cultigen permits the recognition of cultivars, unlike the 1923 definition which restricts the idea of the cultigen to plants at the rank of species.
In later publications of the Liberty Hyde Bailey Hortorium, Cornell, the idea of the cultigen having the rank of species returned (e.g. Hortus Second in 1941 and Hortus Third in 1976): both of these publications indicate that the terms cultigen and cultivar are not synonymous and that cultigens exist at the rank of species only.
A cultigen is a plant or group of apparent specific rank, known only in cultivation, with no determined nativity, presumably having originated, in the form in which we know it, under domestication. Compare indigen. Examples are Cucurbita maxima, Phaseolus vulgaris, Zea mays.

Recent usage in horticulture has, however, maintained a distinction between cultigen and cultivar while nevertheless allowing the inclusion of cultivars within the definition (see "Usage in horticulture" below).

Cultivars 
Cultigen and cultivar may be confused with one another. Cultigen is a general-purpose term encompassing not only plants with cultivar names but others as well (see introductory text above), while cultivar is a formal classification category (in the ICNCP).

Although in his 1923 paper Bailey used only the rank of species for the cultigen, it was clear to him that many domesticated plants were more like botanical varieties than species and so he established a new classification category for these, the cultivar. Bailey was never explicit about the etymology of the word cultivar and it has been suggested that it is a contraction of the words "cultigen" or "cultivated" and "variety". He defined cultivar in his 1923 paper as:  ... "a race subordinate to species, that has originated and persisted under cultivation; it is not necessarily, however, referable to a recognised botanical species. It is essentially the equivalent of the botanical variety except in respect to its origin".

This definition and understanding of cultivar has changed over time (see current definition in cultivar).

Usage

Usage in botany 
In botanical literature the word cultigen is generally used to denote a plant which, like the bread wheat (Triticum aestivum) is of unknown origin, but presumed to be an ancient human selection. Plants like bread wheat have been given binomials according to the Botanical Code and  therefore have names with the same form as those of plant species that occur naturally in the wild, but it is not necessary for a cultigen to have a species name, or to have the biological characteristics that distinguish a species. Cultigens can have names at any of various other ranks, including cultivar names, names in the classification categories of grex and group, variety names, forma names, or they may be plants that have been altered by humans (including genetically modified plants) but which have not been given formal names.

Usage in horticulture 
The year 1953 was an important one for cultivated plant taxonomy because this was the date of publication of the first International Code of Nomenclature for Cultivated Plants in which Bailey's term cultivar was introduced. It was also the year that the eponymous journal commemorating the work of Bailey (who died in 1954), Baileya, was published. In the first volume of Baileya taxonomist and colleague of Bailey, George Lawrence, wrote a short article clarifying the distinction between the new term cultivar and the variety. In the same article he also tried to clarify the critical term taxon which had been introduced by German biologist Meyer in the 1920s but had only just been introduced and accepted in botanical circles. This brief article by Lawrence is useful for its insight into the understanding of the meaning of the word cultigen at this time. He opens the article: In 1918, L.H. Bailey distinguished those plants originating in cultivation from the native plants by designating the former as cultigens and the latter as indigens (indigenous or native to the region). At the same time he proposed the term cultivar to distinguish varieties originating in cultivation from botanical varieties known first in the wild.

In horticulture the definition and use of the terms cultigen and cultivar has varied. One example is the definition given in the Botanical Glossary of The New Royal Horticultural Society Dictionary of Gardening, which defines a cultigen as:  "A plant found only in cultivation or in the wild having escaped from cultivation; included here are many hybrids and cultivars,"... 

The use of cultigen in this sense is essentially the same as the definition of the cultigen published by Bailey in 1924.

The Cultivated Plant Code, however, states that cultigens are "maintained as recognisable entities solely by continued propagation", and thus would not include plants that have evolved subsequent to escape from cultivation.

Recommended usage 
Wider use of the term cultigen as defined here has been proposed for the following reasons:

 supports current usage in horticulture
 assists clarity in non-technical discussions about "wild" and "cultivated" plants (for example, cultivated plants as commonly understood (plants in cultivation) are not the same as the "cultivated plants" of the Cultivated Plant Code, and the distinction between "wild" and "cultivated" habitats is becoming progressively blurred)
 has the potential to simplify the language and definitions used in the Articles and Recommendations of the Cultivated Plant Code
 gives greater precision and clarity to the definition of the respective scope, terminology and concepts of the Botanical Code and the Cultivated Plant Code
 avoids the potential for confusion within the Cultivated Plant Code over its scope, that is, whether it is concerned with:
 where plants are growing (in the wild or in cultivation)
 how they originated (whether they are the result of intentional human activity or not)
 whether it simply provides a mechanism for regulating the names of those cultigens requiring special classification categories that are not part of the  Linnaean hierarchy of the Botanical Code i.e. cultivar and Group names

Critique of definition 

Potential misunderstandings and questions arising from the definition of cultigen given here have been discussed in the literature and are summarised below.

 Natural and artificial selection
The selection process is termed "artificial" when human preferences or influences have a significant effect on the evolution of a particular population or species (see artificial selection). Note: artificial selection is a part of the overall selection process – it does not imply that humans are not part of nature, it is simply useful sometimes to distinguish when there has been human influence on selection (as with cultigens).

 What exactly does altered mean?
There are cases that do not seem to comply with the definition. For example, we can presume that the entire global flora is changing as a result of human-induced climate change. Does this mean that all plants are cultigens?

In cases like this the definition refers to "deliberate" selection and this would be of particular plant characteristics that are not exhibited by a plant's wild counterparts (but see Selections from the wild).

 What exactly does deliberately selected mean?
From the moment a plant is taken from the wild it is subject to human selection pressure – from the selection of the original propagation material to the purchase of the plant in a nursery. Surely this form of selection is not deliberate? Again, the early human selection of crops 7,000-10,000 years ago is thought to have occurred quite unintentionally. Variants useful to horticulture often arise spontaneously, they are not deliberate products. Are these cases of unintentional, accidental, or unconscious selection?

There certainly appear to be cases where origin or selection of a plant is not "deliberate". However, the long term propagation of plants that have some utility, usually economic or ornamental, can hardly be regarded as unintentional and these plants will, almost without exception, have characteristic(s) that distinguish them from their wild counterparts.

 What about plants selected from the wild?
Plants like Quercus robur, Pedunculate or English Oak, Liquidambar styraciflua, Sweetgum and Eucalyptus globulus, Blue Gum grown in parks and gardens are essentially the same as their wild counterparts and are therefore not cultigens. However, occasionally within natural plant variation there occur characters that are of value to horticulture but of little interest to botany. For example a plant might have flowers of several different colours but these may not have been given formal botanical names. It is customary in horticulture to introduce such variants to commerce and to give them cultivar names. Technically these plants have not been deliberately altered in any way from plants growing (or once growing) in the wild but as they are deliberately selected and named it seems permissible to refer to them as cultigens. These occurrences are very few. The definition could be (clumsily) extended by mentioning that selection can be for "desirable variation that is not recognised in botanical nomenclature".

 What about gene flow between populations?
Occasionally cultigens escape from cultivation into the wild where they breed with indigenous plants. Selections may be made from the progeny in the wild and brought back into cultivation where they are used for breeding and the results of the breeding again escape into the wild to breed with indigenous plants. Lantana has behaved much like this. The genetic material of a cultigen may become part of the gene pool of a population where, over time, it may be largely or completely swamped. In cases like this what plants are to be called cultigens?

Whether a plant is a cultigen or not does not depend on where it is growing. If it complies with the definition then it is a cultigen. Cases like this have always been difficult for botanical nomenclature. Unnamed progeny in the wild might be given a name like Lantana aff. camara (aff. = having affinities with) or may remain unnamed. Its cultigenic origin may or may not be recognised by the allocation of a cultivar name.

 Plants of unknown origin
Occasionally plants will occur whose origin is unknown. Plants growing in cultivation that are unknown in the wild may be determined as cultigenic as a result of scientific investigation, but may remain a mystery.

 Difficult cases
It may happen that a hybrid cross that has occurred in nature is also performed deliberately in cultivation and that the progeny appear identical. How do we know which plants are cultigens?

If the cross in cultivation is followed by deliberate selection and naming then this will indicate a cultigen. However in a case like this it may not be possible to tell.

See also 

 Domestication of plants
 Human impact on the environment
 Indigen
 Liberty Hyde Bailey
 Artificial selection
 Binomial nomenclature
 Cultivar
 Cultivated plant taxonomy

References

Footnotes

Further reading

External links 

  Proposal of the term cultigen at the V International Symposium on the Taxonomy of Cultivated Plants 2008
  International Society for Horticultural Science (includes links to the Botanical Code, Cultivated Plant Code and web sites of International Cultivar Registration Authorities). Retrieved 2009-09-16.

Cultivars
Botanical nomenclature
Crops
Domesticated plants
Forest management
Horticulture
Plant breeding